Bob and Mike Bryan defeated Max Mirnyi and Andy Ram in the final, 7–6(7–5), 6–3 to win the doubles tennis title at the 2009 ATP World Tour Finals. It was their third Tour Finals title.

Daniel Nestor and Nenad Zimonjić were the defending champions, but were eliminated in the round-robin stage.

Seeds

Draw

Finals

Group A
Standings are determined by: 1. number of wins; 2. number of matches; 3. in two-players-ties, head-to-head records; 4. in three-players-ties, percentage of sets won, or of games won; 5. steering-committee decision.

Group B
Standings are determined by: 1. number of wins; 2. number of matches; 3. in two-players-ties, head-to-head records; 4. in three-players-ties, percentage of sets won, or of games won; 5. steering-committee decision.

External links
Draw

Doubles